This article summarizes the results and overall performance of Brazil at the FIFA World Cup, including the qualification phase and the final phase, officially called the World Cup finals. The qualification phase, which currently takes place over the three years preceding the finals, is used to determine which teams qualify for the finals. The current format of the finals involves 32 teams competing for the title, at venues within the host nation (or nations) over a period of about a month. The World Cup Final is the most widely viewed sporting event in the world, with an estimated over 1 billion people watching the 2014 tournament final.

Brazil is the most successful national team in the history of the World Cup, having won five titles, earning second place, third place and fourth place finishes twice each. Brazil is one of the countries besides Argentina, Spain and Germany to win a FIFA World Cup away from its continent and the only one to do it in four different continents. (Sweden 1958, Chile 1962, Mexico 1970, United States 1994 and South Korea/Japan 2002). Brazil is the only national team to have played in all FIFA World Cup editions without any absence or need for playoffs. In 22 World Cup tournaments, Brazil had 76 victories out of 114 matches. Brazil also has the best overall performance in World Cup history in both proportional and absolute terms with a record of 76 victories in 114 matches played, 129 goal difference, 247 points and only 19 losses.

Traditionally, Brazil's greatest rival is Argentina. The two countries have met each other four times in the history of the FIFA World Cup, with two wins for Brazil (West Germany 1974 and Spain 1982), one for Argentina (Italy 1990) and a draw (Argentina 1978). The country that played most against Brazil in the finals is Sweden: 7 times, with five wins for Brazil and two draws. Three other historical rivals are Italy, which lost two World Cup finals against Brazil and eliminated the Brazilians in two tournaments (France 1938 and Spain 1982), France, which has defeated Brazil on three occasions (Mexico 1986, France 1998 and Germany 2006), and the Netherlands, which has eliminated Brazil at two of their five meetings (West Germany 1974 and South Africa 2010) and  won the third place match in Brazil 2014.

Brazil won their first world cup final in 1958, 28 years after the first competition was held in 1930. The second longest streak before winning their fourth world cup title in 1994 came 24 years after winning their third title in 1970. Since earning their fifth world cup final and title in 2002, it has currently been 20 years since Brazil has reached and won another world cup final.

Records

*Draws include knockout matches decided via penalty shoot-out.

Winning World Cups

By match

By opponent

Record players

Brazil's record World Cup player, Cafu is also the only player ever to have appeared in three consecutive World Cup finals: 1994, 1998 and 2002.

Most matches played

Most tournament appearances

Altogether eight players share the record of four participations. The goalkeeper Émerson Leão is the only one who has played four tournaments non-consecutively (not called at 1982).

Top scorers

Five Brazilians have won the World Cup Golden Boot Award over the years: Leônidas with 7 goals in 1938, Ademir with 9 goals in 1950, Garrincha and Vavá with 4 goals each in 1962 and Ronaldo with 8 goals in 2002.

Players provided by club 

Below is the list of clubs that have provided more than 5 players throughout the FIFA World Cup editions:

Notes

1930: Some sources claim that players Doca (São Cristóvão) and Benevenuto (Flamengo) were not officially entered  at the 1930 squad. This count includes Benevenuto and Doca. Araken never played for Flamengo, but he was registered as a club athlete just as a matter of formality, since APEA (São Paulo) was in a power struggle over command of Brazilian football with the CBD, situated in Rio de Janeiro. The player, in fact, had terminated with Santos and signed with São Paulo.
1934: This count does not include players who didn't travel to Italy and stayed on stand-by in Brazil: Almeida (Bahia), Bilé (Ypiranga-SP), Jaguaré (Corinthians) and Pamplona (Botafogo). Neither includes Domingos da Guia, barred from participating in the competition by Nacional Montevideo, who had already ceded Patesko and demanded a high compensation fee.

Awards and records

Team awards

1958 World Cup Champions 

1962 World Cup Champions 

1970 World Cup Champions 

1994 World Cup Champions 

2002 World Cup Champions 

FIFA Fair Play Trophy 1982
FIFA Fair Play Trophy 1986
FIFA Fair Play Trophy 1994
FIFA Fair Play Trophy 2006
Most Entertaining Team 1994

Individual awards

Golden Ball awards

Golden Ball 1938: Leônidas
Golden Ball 1950: Zizinho
Golden Ball 1958: Didi
Golden Ball 1962: Garrincha
Golden Ball 1970: Pelé
Golden Ball 1994: Romário
Golden Ball 1998: Ronaldo (youngest Golden Ball winner of all time at 21 years)
Silver Ball 1958: Pelé (youngest Ball award winner at 17 years)
Silver Ball 1970: Gérson
Silver Ball 1982: Falcão
Silver Ball 2002: Ronaldo
Bronze Ball 1950: Ademir
Bronze Ball 1978: Dirceu

Golden Boot awards

Golden Boot 1938: Leônidas
Golden Boot 1950: Ademir
Golden Boot 1962: Garrincha and Vavá (shared)
Golden Boot 2002: Ronaldo
Silver Boot 1958: Pelé (youngest Boot award winner at 17 years)
Silver Boot 1970: Jairzinho
Silver Boot 1986: Careca
Silver Boot 2002: Rivaldo
Bronze Boot 1950: Chico
Bronze Boot 1982: Zico
Bronze Boot 1994: Romário
Bronze Boot 2006: Ronaldo
Bronze Boot 2014: Neymar

Other individual awards

Best Young Player Award 1958: Pelé (youngest Best Young Player award winner at 17 years)
Man of the Match award 2002: Rivaldo

Awards as coaches of other nations

Brazilian coaches have appeared on the sidelines of other nations with some regularity. Three of them have won team awards with their nations:

Otto Glória won Third Place with Portugal in 1966.
Didi won the FIFA Fair Play Trophy with Peru in 1970.
Luiz Felipe Scolari won the Most Entertaining Team award with Portugal in 2006.

Team records

Most titles (5)
Most participations (22)
Most games played (114)
Most victories (76)
Most goals scored (237)
Biggest goal difference (+129)
Most sendings-off (11)
Most finishes in the Top 8 (19) and Top 16 (22)
Most consecutive wins (11) and matches without losing (13)
One of two teams to have defended their title as champions (1962). The other being Italy (1938).
One of two teams to have progressed to three consecutive World Cup finals (1994-2002). The other being Germany (1982-1990).
Most wins in one tournament (7, 2002)
Biggest goal difference as champion (+14, 2002), shared with Germany (2014)

Individual records

Pelé holds a number of FIFA World Cup records:
Only player to win three FIFA World Cups (1958, 1962 and 1970)
Youngest tournament winner (1958, at 17y 249d)
Youngest goalscorer (1958 v Wales, at 17y 239d)
Youngest hat-trick scorer (1958 v France, at 17y 244d)
Youngest goalscorer in a final (1958 v Sweden, at 17y 249d)
Youngest Golden Ball winner: Ronaldo (1998, at 21y 9m 24d)
Most appearances in an All-Star Team: Djalma Santos (3, 1954–1962) (shared with Franz Beckenbauer and Philipp Lahm)
Most appearances as a substitute: Denílson (11, 1998–2002)
Most tournament wins as player and coach: Mário Zagallo (3, 1958 & 1962 as player, 1970 as coach)
Only player to appear in three consecutive FIFA World Cup finals: Cafu (1994, 1998 and 2002)
Most team awards won: Cafu (4, 1994–2006)
Most cautions: Cafu (6), shared with Zinedine Zidane and Rafael Márquez

References

External links
 FIFA World Cup official website
 Brazil at FIFA.com

 
World Cup
Countries at the FIFA World Cup